Old Homestead, also known as Pine Grove Farm and Honey Creek Farm, is a historic home located in Little Beaver Township, Lawrence County, Pennsylvania.  It was built between 1824 and 1825, and is a -story, Federal-style dwelling with a gable roof.  The building measures 39 feet, 4 inches, by 38 feet, 6 inches.  It features unusual stepped front and rear walls.

It was added to the National Register of Historic Places in 1980.

References

Houses on the National Register of Historic Places in Pennsylvania
Federal architecture in Pennsylvania
Houses completed in 1825
Houses in Lawrence County, Pennsylvania
National Register of Historic Places in Lawrence County, Pennsylvania